Andrei Virgil Ivan (born 4 January 1997) is a Romanian professional footballer who plays as a forward for Liga I club Universitatea Craiova and the Romania national team.

He started out as a senior at Universitatea Craiova in 2014, and three and a half years later earned a transfer abroad to Russian Premier League side Krasnodar. Ivan did not impose himself and was loaned for one season to Rapid Wien in Austria, before returning to Craiova in the summer of 2019.

Ivan registered his senior debut for the Romania national team in 2015, in a 1–1 exhibition draw with Italy.

Club career

Early career / Universitatea Craiova
Ivan began playing youth football at local Flacăra Moreni, before moving in 2011 to Sporting Pitești. On 30 December 2013, Ivan joined CS Universitatea Craiova on a two-and-a-half-year deal for an undisclosed fee. He scored his first goal for the club on 28 May 2014, in a 2–0 home victory over ASA Târgu Mureș counting for the Liga II championship. Ivan made eight appearances during the season, as his team managed to achieve promotion by winning its series.

On 2 August 2014, he netted his first Liga I goal by coming off the bench as an 82nd-minute substitute in a 1–3 away loss to defending champions FC Steaua București. In January 2016, Ivan refused to sign for the latter club, which had an agreement in place with Craiova for a move worth €2.15 million. Several foreign teams were also interested in transferring him and Ivan revealed his dream of playing abroad. At the start of 2017, he gained team captaincy following the departure of Bogdan Vătăjelu to Sparta Prague.

Krasnodar
Russian side FC Krasnodar signed Ivan for a rumoured fee of €4 million on 17 July 2017, with the player penning a five-year contract and Universitatea Craiova retaining 25% interest on a future transfer. He recorded his competitive debut on 20 August, after entering as an 84th-minute substitute for Viktor Claesson in a Russian Premier League goalless draw with Rostov.

On 24 June 2018, Ivan joined Rapid Wien in Austria on a year-long with a purchase option. He totalled 40 appearances in all competitions throughout the season, of which eleven in the UEFA Europa League, and scored three goals. Upon his return to Krasnodar, he played one game for the reserves in the Football National League, the second level of the Russian league system.

Return to Universitatea Craiova
Universitatea Craiova announced the re-signing of Ivan on a four-year deal on 28 August 2019. According to press, the Alb-albaștrii paid €1.5 million to bring him back to Oltenia.

On 23 May 2021, Ivan claimed his first major honour after opening the scoring in a 3–2 victory over Astra Giurgiu in the Cupa României final. On 10 July, he started in the 4–2 penalty shoot-out win over CFR Cluj in the subsequent Supercupa României.

Amid reports linking him to Galatasaray, Ivan scored all but one of his side's goals in a 5–2 defeat of Mioveni on 30 October 2021.

International career
Ivan made his full international debut for Romania on 17 November 2015, aged 18, coming on as a substitute in a 2–2 friendly draw with Italy at the Stadio Renato Dall'Ara in Bologna. He scored his first goal for the nation six years later, in a 1–2 loss to Georgia in Ploiești on 2 June 2021.

Style of play
Ivan is a versatile forward who can be deployed as a winger, by preference on the left flank, or as a striker in the centre.

Career statistics

Club

International

Scores and results list Romania's goal tally first, score column indicates score after each Ivan goal.

Honours
Universitatea Craiova
Liga II: 2013–14
Cupa României: 2020–21
Supercupa României: 2021

Rapid Wien
Austrian Cup runner-up: 2018–19

Individual
Liga I Team of the Season: 2016–17, 2021–22

Gazeta Sporturilor Romania Player of the Month: October 2021

References

External links

1997 births
Living people
People from Moreni
Romanian footballers
Association football forwards
Liga I players
Liga II players
CS Universitatea Craiova players
Russian Premier League players
FC Krasnodar players
Austrian Football Bundesliga players
SK Rapid Wien players
Romania youth international footballers
Romania under-21 international footballers
Romania international footballers
Romanian expatriate footballers
Expatriate footballers in Russia
Romanian expatriate sportspeople in Russia
Expatriate footballers in Austria
Romanian expatriate sportspeople in Austria
FC Krasnodar-2 players